Hypholoma lateritium, sometimes called brick cap, chestnut mushroom, cinnamon cap, brick top, red woodlover or kuritake, is a fungal species in the genus Hypholoma, which also contains the poisonous species  Hypholoma fasciculare and the edible Hypholoma capnoides.  Its fruiting bodies are generally larger than either of these.  Hypholoma sublateritium is a synonym.

In Europe this mushroom is often considered inedible or even poisonous, but in the US and Japan it is apparently a popular edible fungus.  One reason to avoid it in the wild is the possibility of confusion with Galerina marginata or H. fasciculare.

In Pennsylvania, New Jersey, and West Virginia they are found in dense clusters on stumps and roots from October until long after frosts.

Description
The cap is 3.5–10 cm in diameter, usually with a brick-red coloration in the center and a paler margin.  It is smooth, sometimes with red-brown flecks in the middle and sometimes with flaky veil remnants, which can easily be washed off in the rain, on the outside.
The gills are crowded, starting yellowish and becoming grayish with age. They do not have the green color of Hypholoma fasciculare.
The stipe is light yellow and darker below.
Spores have a germ pore and are 6.0-7.5 × 3.5-4.0 μm. The cheilocystidia are variable; the spore print is purple-brown.

This species is sometimes considered edible but caution must be taken to avoid confusing it with similar-looking deadly species such as Galerina marginata. The taste of Hypholoma lateritium is mild to somewhat bitter.
However, when cooked, brick caps have a nutty flavor.  They are especially delicious when sauteed in olive oil. Brick Tops have been considered one of the better edibles of late fall in the Northeast United States.

They are best when collected young; older specimens tend to be bitter from being fouled by insects.

Source
Mostly taken from the German page.

References

External links
http://www.mushroomexpert.com/hypholoma_sublateritium.html

Gallery

Hypholoma
Fungi of Europe
Fungi of North America
Taxa named by Jacob Christian Schäffer